Aldrovandi is a family name of the Emilia-Romagna in Italy, and especially famous for the aristocratic and Senatorial family from Bologna. The Palazzo Aldrovandi in central Bologna was built by the family. Among its famous members are:
Cardinal Pompeo Aldrovandi (1668–1752), Italian Cardinal of the Roman Catholic Church
Ulisse Aldrovandi (1522–1605), an Italian botanist and naturalist, after which the genus Aldrovanda is named
Luigi Aldrovandi Marescotti, Count of Viano (1876–1945) Italian politician and diplomat

Other
Aldrovandi Villa Borghese- a hotel in Rome